"Play That Funky Music" is a song written by Rob Parissi and recorded by the band Wild Cherry. The single was the first released by the Cleveland-based Sweet City record label in April 1976 and distributed by Epic Records. The performers on the recording included lead singer Parissi, electric guitarist Bryan Bassett, bassist Allen Wentz, and drummer Ron Beitle, with session players Chuck Berginc, Jack Brndiar (trumpets), and Joe Eckert and Rick Singer (saxes) on the horn riff that runs throughout the song's verses. The single hit No. 1 on the Billboard Hot 100 on September 18, 1976; it was also No. 1 on the Billboard Hot Soul Singles chart. The single was certified platinum by the Recording Industry Association of America for shipments of over 2 million records and eventually sold 2.5 million in the United States alone. 

The song was listed at No. 93 on Billboard magazine's "All-Time Top 100 Songs" in 2018. It was also the group's only US Top 40 song.

Composition
Wild Cherry was a hard rock cover band, but with the advent and popularity of the disco era, it began to be difficult to get bookings because audiences wanted to dance. Parissi told the band that if they wanted to get bookings, they were going to have to start to include dance tunes in their sets, but the band resisted becoming a disco band. While playing at the 2001 Club on the North Side of Pittsburgh to a predominantly black audience, a patron said to band member Beitle during a break, "Are you going to play some funky music, white boys?" Parissi grabbed a pen and order pad and wrote the song in about five minutes.  The lyrics literally describe the predicament of a hard rock band adjusting to the disco era.

Charts

Weekly charts

Year-end charts

All-time charts

Certifications

Vanilla Ice version

American rapper Vanilla Ice later released a song featuring an interpretation of "Play That Funky Music". Based on this single, the independent record label Ichiban Records signed Vanilla Ice to a record deal, releasing the album Hooked in January 1989, containing "Play That Funky Music" and its B-side, "Ice Ice Baby". Songwriter Robert Parissi was not credited. Parissi was later awarded $500,000 in a copyright infringement lawsuit.

Although it did not initially catch on, its B-side, "Ice Ice Baby", gained more success when a disc jockey played that track instead of the single's A-side.

Following the success of "Ice Ice Baby", "Play That Funky Music" was reissued as its own single (with new lyrics and remixed drums), and peaked at No. 4 on the US Billboard Hot 100 and No. 10 in the UK. The song's accompanying music video received heavy rotation on MTV Europe.

Charts

Weekly charts

Year-end charts

Other cover versions
In 1988, the band Roxanne reached No. 63 on the Billboard Hot 100 with a cover version.

English rock band Thunder reached No. 39 in the UK singles chart in 1998 with a cover, taken from their album Giving the Game Away.

Usage in other media
The song appears on the opening show Ces gars-là, a French-language Canadian show on V Télé featuring the stand-up comic Sugar Sammy and Simon-Olivier Fecteau.

In the Season Eight episode of The Big Bang Theory, "The Skywalker Intrusion", Sheldon Cooper says to Leonard Hofstadter "Play that funky music, white boy" when Leonard turns on the car radio, though Sheldon is unfamiliar with the cultural reference.  When Leonard plays the song for him, Sheldon analyzes the song, concluding that the lyrics present a musical example of Russell's paradox.

See also
List of Billboard Hot 100 number-one singles of 1976
List of Cash Box Top 100 number-one singles of 1976
List of number-one R&B singles of 1976 (U.S.)
List of 1970s one-hit wonders in the United States

References

External links
Lyrics of this song

1976 singles
1976 songs
1990 debut singles
Billboard Hot 100 number-one singles
Cashbox number-one singles
Epic Records singles
SBK Records singles
Songs about music
Wild Cherry (band) songs
Vanilla Ice songs